Margaret Cullen Landis (August 31, 1890 – April 8, 1981) was an American silent screen actress who appeared in at least 41 films between 1915 and 1931.

Biography

Margaret Cullen Landis was born in Nashville, Tennessee, the daughter of Lulan and Margaret (née Cullen) Landis. Her father was a stockbroker and her younger brother, Cullen Landis was a successful silent film director and actor. (Margaret Landis is no relation to film director John Landis) She began her career with Balboa Studios as a dancer in the 1915 film Who Pays.

Near the midpoint of her career she took some time off to study art, eventually returning to film work around 1921.

Landis married film director Bertram Bracken on April 5, 1919, and they divorced in 1924. She married James Hamilton Couper, a World War I veteran who came from a prominent Georgia Coast family, in 1930.

Both Margaret and her brother Cullen left Hollywood soon after the arrival of sound. Margaret Landis’ last film was the talkie Sheer Luck (1931).

Landis had a stroke in 1969 and died on April 8, 1981, at Alameda, California, and is interred with her husband at the Fort Rosecrans National Cemetery.

Selected filmography

 Code of the Yukon (1918)
Amarilly of Clothes-Line Alley (1918)
Mr. Fix-It (1918)
 The Confession (1920)
 Parted Curtains (1920)
Harriet and the Piper (1920)
Sowing the Wind (1921)
 Ashes (1922)
 The Ladder Jinx (1922)
 Rose o' the Sea (1922)
 Alice Adams (1923)
 What Wives Want (1923)
 The Cricket on the Hearth (1923)
 The Love Brand (1923)
 The Miracle Baby (1923)
 A Million to Burn (1923)
 The Slanderers (1924)
 Passion's Pathway (1924)
 The Western Wallop (1924)
 Her Man (1924)
 Fighter's Paradise (1924)
 A Fighting Heart (1924)
 The Empire Builders (1924)
 Trigger Fingers (1924)
 My Man (1924)
 An Enemy Of Men (1925)
 Youth and Adventure (1925)
The Latest from Paris (1928)
 Sheer Luck (1931)

References

External links

 

1890 births
1981 deaths
American film actresses
American silent film actresses
Actresses from Nashville, Tennessee
20th-century American actresses
Burials at Fort Rosecrans National Cemetery